The City of Hormuz Ardeshir (Persian: شهر هرمز اردشیر) is a Sassanid-era Persian archaeological remain. It is now located in the Khuzestan province in South-Western Iran/Persia.

It is believed that Ezzatollah Negahban first referred to the location as the city of Hormuz Ardashir. He had uncovered many Sassanid pottery artifacts in the region.

Hormuz Ardashir is believed to have been originally built by Ardashir I, the founder of Sassanid dynasty (224-651 CE), upon the ruins of the Achaemenid city of Tareiana.

In 2007, the construction was halted due to concerns by local heritage activists that the tunneling would destroy the ancient Sassanid city of Hormuz Ardeshir.

See also
Ardeshir I
Persian Empire
Sasanian Dynasty

References

External links
Hormuz-Ardeshir City Photo Gallery (Hamshahri Online)

Iranian studies
Persian studies
Archaeological sites in Iran
Sasanian architecture